Charlie, Last Name Wilson is the third studio album by American singer Charlie Wilson. It was released by Jive Records on August 23, 2005, in the United States. The album includes production from several R&B hitmakers including R. Kelly, will.i.am, Justin Timberlake, T-Pain, KayGee, Terence "Tramp-Baby" Abney, The Underdogs and The Platinum Brothers. Charlie, Last Name Wilson debuted and peaked at number 10 on the US Billboard 200 with first week sales of 71,400 copies. In 2009, it was also certified gold by the RIAA, surpassing sales of 500,000 copies.

Track listing

Notes
  denotes co-producer

Sample credits
"Floatin'" contains a portion of the composition of "Over Like a Fat Rat" as written by Leroy Burgess, James Calloway & Aaron Davenport.

Charts

Weekly charts

Year-end charts

Certifications

References

External links
 

2005 albums
Charlie Wilson (singer) albums
Albums produced by R. Kelly
Albums produced by the Underdogs (production team)